The  is a member of the Cabinet of Japan and is the leader and chief executive of the Ministry of Agriculture, Forestry and Fisheries. The minister is nominated by the Prime Minister of Japan and is appointed by the Emperor of Japan. 

The current minister is Tetsuro Nomura, who took office on 10 August 2022.



List of Ministers of Agriculture, Forestry and Fisheries

References

External links
 Official website

Japan